Johannes Skagius (born 10 February 1995) is a Swedish swimmer and holder of the Swedish breaststroke record.

References

1995 births
Living people
Sundsvalls SS swimmers
Universiade medalists in swimming
Universiade silver medalists for Sweden
Medalists at the 2017 Summer Universiade
Competitors at the 2019 Summer Universiade
Swedish male breaststroke swimmers